The following is a list of teams and cyclists that took part in the 2019 Tour de France.

Teams
The 18 UCI WorldTeams are automatically invited to the race. Additionally, the organisers of the Tour, the Amaury Sport Organisation (ASO), invited 
four second-tier UCI Professional Continental teams to participate in the event. The three French teams and one Belgian team have each participated in the race before.

UCI WorldTeams

The teams entering the race will be:

 
 
 
 
 
 
 
 
 
 
 
 
 
 
 
 
 
 

UCI Professional Continental teams

Cyclists

By starting number

By team

By nationality 
The 176 riders that are competing in the 2019 Tour de France originated from 30 different countries.

References

2019 Tour de France
2019